Fernando Jr Mercado Villar (born 4 December 1994) is an American former soccer player who last played as a midfielder for Venados F.C.

References

External links
 

Fernando Mercado at Soccer Punter
Fernando Mercado at Haysfreepress: Going pro

1994 births
Living people
American soccer players
Mexican footballers
Soccer players from California
Association football midfielders
American sportspeople of Mexican descent
Ascenso MX players
Venados F.C. players
Real Estelí F.C. players
Nicaraguan Primera División players